Events from the year 1638 in Ireland.

Incumbent
Monarch: Charles I

Events
January 13 – proclamation enforcing the monopoly on tobacco held by the Lord Deputy of Ireland, Sir Thomas Wentworth.

Arts and literature
January 1 – John Shirley's comedy The Royal Master is premiered at the Werburgh Street Theatre, Dublin.

Births
Valentine Browne, 1st Viscount Kenmare, peer (d. 1694)

Deaths
June 14 – Claud Hamilton, 2nd Baron Hamilton of Strabane (b. c.1606)

References

 
1630s in Ireland
Ireland
Years of the 17th century in Ireland